San Pedru Culiema is one of 54 parish councils in Cangas del Narcea, a municipality within the province and autonomous community of Asturias, in northern Spain. 

Its villages include: Barnéu, Soutu los Molinos, Vecil, Viḷḷadestre, and Viḷḷouril de Sierra.

References

Parishes in Cangas del Narcea